The Additional Act was an amendment to the Brazilian Constitution of 1824, passed on August 12, 1834. The amendment enhanced the autonomy of the provinces.

References
 

1834 in law
1830s in Brazil
Brazil